Laut (literally "sea") is an island in the Kota Baru Regency in the Indonesian province of South Kalimantan. It has an area of 2,023.76 km2 (including offshore islets) and a population according to the official estimates as at mid 2021 of 162,591. The town of Kotabaru at the northern tip of the island is the administrative capital of the regency.

References

Islands of Kalimantan
Landforms of South Kalimantan
Populated places in Indonesia